Royal Zambian Airlines is a regional airline in Zambia based at Kenneth Kaunda International Airport and a subsidiary of Royal Air Charters, a charter company based in Lusaka, Zambia. The airline serves as a link between Zambia and its neighboring countries aiming at bringing in business and tourist travelers.

Royal Zambian Airlines has a hangar at Kenneth Kaunda International Airport where it stores its three aircraft.

History 

Royal Zambian Airlines was founded in May 2020 and commenced operations on December 17, 2020, with a flight to Johannesburg. The airline started by operating just one Embraer Erj-145LR on a scheduled service to Johannesburg from their main operating base in Lusaka along with two other Embraer aircraft in storage.

Its parent company, Royal Air Charters, first started operating in 2007 and has stayed afloat since then.

Destinations 
As of December 2020, Royal Zambian Airlines operated these following destinations:

Fleet 
As of December 2020, Royal Zambian Airlines operated these following aircraft:

References 

Airlines of Zambia
Airlines established in 2020
Companies based in Lusaka